Cricket was included for the first time at the 2010 South Asian Games, hosted by Dhaka, Bangladesh. A men's 20-over tournament was played from 31 January to 7 February 2010.

The tournament was contested by five of the eight members of the South Asian Sports Council, with squads restricted to players aged 21 or under. Two venues were used – the Shahid Kamruzzaman Stadium in Rajshahi and the Sher-e-Bangla National Stadium in Dhaka. Bangladesh, captained by Mithun Ali, defeated Sri Lanka in the final to claim the gold medal, while Pakistan defeated Nepal in a play-off for the bronze medal. The leading run-scorer at the tournament was Sri Lanka's Ashan Priyanjan, while Bangladesh's Subashis Roy and Pakistan's Kamran Hussain were the joint leading wicket-takers.

Eligibility
The teams for the South Asian Games had to consist of players who were under the age of 21 as of January 28, 2010.

Squads
Five countries sent teams to the tournament – Bangladesh, the Maldives, Nepal, Pakistan, and Sri Lanka. Of those, Bangladesh, Pakistan and Sri Lanka were full members of the International Cricket Council (ICC), while Nepal was an associate member and the Maldives were an affiliate. In March 2009, it was reported that Afghanistan, Bhutan, and India would also send teams, but this did not eventuate.

Group stage

Points table

Fixtures

Finals

Bronze medal play-off

Final

Statistics

Most runs
The top five run-scorers are included in this table, ranked by runs scored and then by batting average.

Source: ESPNcricinfo

Most wickets

The top five wicket-takers are listed in this table, ranked by wickets taken and then by bowling average.

Source: ESPNcricinfo

Final standing

References

External links
 Event information and statistics from  CricketArchive
 Event information and statistics from ESPNcricinfo

Cricket at the South Asian Games
South Asian Games
2010
Cricket